Risedale School (formerly Risedale Sports and Community College) is a coeducational secondary school situated in Hipswell, Catterick Garrison, North Yorkshire, England.

It is a community school administered by North Yorkshire County Council. The school has also been awarded Sports College status as part of the Specialist schools programme.

The school works closely in partnership with all local primary schools whilst supporting the work of other local secondary schools.

The current headteacher of Risedale School is Mr Colin Scott.

References

External links 

Secondary schools in North Yorkshire
Community schools in North Yorkshire
Catterick Garrison